The Cloward–Piven strategy is a political strategy outlined in 1966 by American sociologists and political activists Richard Cloward and Frances Fox Piven.

History
Cloward and Piven were both professors at the Columbia University School of Social Work. The strategy was outlined in a May 1966 article in the liberal magazine The Nation titled  "The Weight of the Poor: A Strategy to End Poverty".

The two stated that many Americans who were eligible for welfare were not receiving benefits, and that a welfare enrollment drive would strain local budgets, precipitating a crisis at the state and local levels that would be a wake-up call for the federal government, particularly the Democratic Party. There would also be side consequences of this strategy, according to Cloward and Piven. These would include: easing the plight of the poor in the short-term (through their participation in the welfare system); shoring up support for the national Democratic Party-then splintered by pluralistic interests (through its cultivation of poor and minority constituencies by implementing a national "solution" to poverty); and relieving local governments of the financially and politically onerous burdens of public welfare (through a national "solution" to poverty).

Strategy
Cloward and Piven's article is focused on forcing the Democratic Party, which in 1966 controlled the presidency and both houses of the United States Congress, to take federal action to help the poor. They stated that full enrollment of those eligible for welfare "would produce bureaucratic disruption in welfare agencies and fiscal disruption in local and state governments" that would: "...deepen existing divisions among elements in the big-city Democratic coalition: the remaining white middle class, the working-class ethnic groups and the growing minority poor. To avoid a further weakening of that historic coalition, a national Democratic administration would be constrained to advance a federal solution to poverty that would override local welfare failures, local class and racial conflicts and local revenue dilemmas."

They further wrote:

Michael Reisch and Janice Andrews wrote that Cloward and Piven "proposed to create a crisis in the current welfare system – by exploiting the gap between welfare law and practice – that would ultimately bring about its collapse and replace it with a system of guaranteed annual income. They hoped to accomplish this end by informing the poor of their rights to welfare assistance, encouraging them to apply for benefits and, in effect, overloading an already overburdened bureaucracy."

Focus on Democrats 
The authors pinned their hopes on creating disruption within the Democratic Party: "Conservative Republicans are always ready to declaim the evils of public welfare, and they would probably be the first to raise a hue and cry. But deeper and politically more telling conflicts would take place within the Democratic coalition...Whites – both working class ethnic groups and many in the middle class – would be aroused against the ghetto poor, while liberal groups, which until recently have been comforted by the notion that the poor are few... would probably support the movement. Group conflict, spelling political crisis for the local party apparatus, would thus become acute as welfare rolls mounted and the strains on local budgets became more severe.”

Reception and criticism

Michael Tomasky, writing about the strategy in the 1990s and again in 2011, called it "wrongheaded and self-defeating", writing: "It apparently didn't occur to [Cloward and Piven] that the system would just regard rabble-rousing black people as a phenomenon to be ignored or quashed."

Impact of the strategy
In papers published in 1971 and 1977, Cloward and Piven argued that mass unrest in the United States, especially between 1964 and 1969, did lead to a massive expansion of welfare rolls, though not to the guaranteed-income program that they had hoped for. Political scientist Robert Albritton disagreed, writing in 1979 that the data did not support this thesis; he offered an alternative explanation for the rise in welfare caseloads.

In his 2006 book Winning the Race, political commentator John McWhorter attributed the rise in the welfare state after the 1960s to the Cloward–Piven strategy, but wrote about it negatively, stating that the strategy "created generations of black people for whom working for a living is an abstraction".

According to historian Robert E. Weir in 2007: "Although the strategy helped to boost recipient numbers between 1966 and 1975, the revolution its proponents envisioned never transpired."

See also
Guaranteed minimum income

References 

Political terminology of the United States
Poverty in the United States